Bronislav Bechyňský (January 1, 1962 in Louny – April 22, 2011 in Prague) was a Czech sport shooter. He competed at the 1996 and 2000 Summer Olympics in the men's skeet event, tying for 32nd place both times.

Olympic results

References

1962 births
2011 deaths
People from Louny
Olympic shooters of the Czech Republic
Skeet shooters
Czech male sport shooters
Shooters at the 1996 Summer Olympics
Shooters at the 2000 Summer Olympics
Sportspeople from the Ústí nad Labem Region